Luis Irizar Zamora (30 May 1930 – 9 December 2021) was one of the founding members of the New Basque Cuisine.

Early years
Born to parents from San Sebastián, he had strong ties to the city and started his career as a chef in the prestigious Hotel María Cristina. During this early period he also worked at the Hotel Azaldegui in San Sebastián, the Restaurant Royal Monceau in Paris and the Hilton in London.

The catering school years
In 1976, Irizar opened the Escuela de Hostelería del Hotel Euromar in Zarautz, then the first catering school in the Basque Country. This school over the years has produced some of the most renowned chefs of the new Basque cuisine movement in the Basque Country, amongst them Karlos Arguiñano, José Ramón Elizondo, Ramón Roteta, and Pedro Subijana.

Later career and death
After spells of working in Madrid and running the Restaurante Irizar, he moved back to San Sebastián, this time to found the Luis Irizar Sukaldaritza Eskola ("Luis Irizar School of Cooking") in 1993.

He died on 9 December 2021, at the age of 91.

References

Etxeberria, H. et al. Erabateko Sukaldaritza Ttarttalo 1998

1930 births
2021 deaths
Spanish chefs
Basque cuisine
Cuban emigrants to Spain
Spanish expatriates in the United Kingdom
People from San Sebastián
Cuban chefs
People from Havana
Spanish expatriates in France